Andon Dončevski (born 19 November 1935) is a former Yugoslav football coach and former player.

Club career
Born in Kavadarci, Kingdom of Yugoslavia, he played with FK Vardar youth team in 1952. He was incorporated into the first team of Vardar, becoming their main goal scorer in the Yugoslav First League and Second League amassing a record 217 goals. Among the awards for his efficiency and scoring was an invitation from Red Star Belgrade to play on their team during their tour in South America. He later coached Vardar from 1985 to 1988. In the 1986–1987 season he won the title with Vardar but after legal proceedings the title was given to Partizan. Dončevski took a new challenge to pass on his experience abroad to Anorthosis Famagusta, Espérance de Tunis, Preston Lions FC, the VPL, in Australia.

International career
Dončevski played for Yugoslav national B team in a game against Poland played in Lodz on 4 June 1961. Afterwards he was called for the main national team on several occasions, but failed to make a debut.

Achievements
As player:

FK Vardar Skopje
Yugoslav Cup: 1
Winner: 1961
Yugoslav Second League: 3
Winner: 1960, 1963 and 1971
Macedonian Republic Cup: 7
Winner: 1965, 1966, 1967, 1968, 1969, 1970 and 1971
Mitropa Cup:
Semi-finalists (1): 1968
Round of 16 (2): 1969, 1970

Statistics

Manager

References

Dončevski keeps optimistic (Interview at UEFA.com)

External links

1935 births
Living people
Sportspeople from Kavadarci
Association football forwards
Macedonian footballers
Yugoslav footballers
FK Vardar players
Yugoslav First League players
Macedonian football managers
Macedonian expatriate football managers
Yugoslav football managers
Yugoslav expatriate football managers
Anorthosis Famagusta F.C. managers
FK Vardar managers
Espérance Sportive de Tunis managers
North Macedonia national football team managers
GFK Tikvesh managers
Preston Lions FC managers
Expatriate football managers in Cyprus
Yugoslav expatriate sportspeople in Cyprus
Expatriate football managers in Tunisia
Macedonian expatriate sportspeople in Tunisia
Expatriate soccer managers in Australia
Macedonian expatriate sportspeople in Australia